Jawaharlal Nehru National College of Engineering or JNNCE is an engineering college established in 1980 by the National Education Society (NES) in Shimoga, Karnataka, India. It is affiliated to the Visvesvaraya Technological University, Belgaum and is accredited by the National Board of Accreditation (NBA), All India Council for Technical Education (AICTE). The college offers seven undergraduate engineering degrees (B.E) and four postgraduate degrees. The Research and Development (R & D) centers in engineering and business departments offer Ph.D. and M.Sc (Engineering) degrees by research.

Facilities
The campus is spread over an area of more than 55 acres. The railway station is about 3 km from college and the KSRTC bus stand is nearly 6 km. There is also a Post Office inside the college campus.

Hostels
The College has separate hostel facilities both for boys and girls. Four hostels for boys, namely, Tunga, Bhadra, Krishna and Sharavathi, are located in the campus. The girls' hostel is a building located near to the college outside the campus. P.G. and Final B.E. students are provided with single rooms.

Transportation
The city is connected by number of college bus. The college has provided bus facility for students coming from Bhadravathi. College buses run between the college and every other part of city throughout the day. 
Bus timings to college are 7:10am,8:05am,10:15m. Bus timing from college are 12:40pm,1:30pm,5:25pm.Buses also operate till 8:30pm in the evening for the convenience of hostel students.

Bank facility
The Canara bank is situated in the campus and it offers banking service to the staff and students of the college.

Academic profile

Admission
Students are admitted to undergraduate courses on basis of their merit in the Karnataka CET test, or in the COMED-K undergraduate test. Students are also admitted through a management quota also that does not require merit(donation). There is a lateral entry scheme in place, by which students holding diploma degrees can enter directly to the second year of study in engineering.

Departments
Basic Science
 Mathematics
 Physics
 Chemistry

Undergraduate
 Electrical and Electronics Engineering
 Telecommunication Engineering
 Mechanical Engineering
 Civil Engineering
 Computer Science Engineering
 Information Science Engineering
 Industrial & Production Engineering
 Electronics and Communication Engineering

Postgraduate
 Master of Business Administration
 Master of Computer Applications
 M. Tech in Computer Science Engineering
 M. Tech in Networking and Internet Engineering
 M. Tech in Design Engineering

References

Engineering colleges in Karnataka
Affiliates of Visvesvaraya Technological University
Monuments and memorials to Jawaharlal Nehru
Education in Shimoga
Universities and colleges in Shimoga district